Sarah Herriot Boyack (born 16 May 1961) is a Scottish Labour politician who has served as a Member of the Scottish Parliament (MSP) for the Lothian region since 2019, and previously from 2011 to 2016. She formerly represented the Edinburgh Central constituency from 1999 to 2011.

Early life and career
Boyack was born in May 1961 in Glasgow and brought up in Edinburgh. Her father, Jim Boyack, was an important figure in the Labour Party and the campaign for Scottish devolution. She was educated at the state comprehensive Royal High School, Edinburgh, where she was one of the first female pupils.

Starting in 1979, Boyack studied Modern History and Politics at the University of Glasgow, graduating with a Scottish MA Honours degree. She became active in the Labour club, where she was a protégé of Margaret Curran. She was chair of the Labour club from 1981 until 1982, and chair of the National Organisation of Labour Students from 1985 until 1986. During her time at Glasgow, she was involved in supporting the twinning with Bir Zeit University in the West Bank. After graduating, she gained a Diploma in Town and Country Planning at Heriot-Watt University.

Boyack worked as a town planner in the London Borough of Brent then as a strategic planner in Central Regional Council in Stirling. She then became a lecturer at the School of Planning and Housing at Heriot-Watt University and was Convener of the Scottish Branch of the Royal Town Planning Institute in 1997.

Political career

Member of the Scottish Parliament: 1999–2016 
Boyack was elected to the new Scottish Parliament in the 1999 election for the Edinburgh Central constituency. She was Minister for Transport and the Environment in the Scottish Executive from 1999 until 2000. Then, she was Minister for Transport and Planning from 2000 until 2001, during which time she introduced one of Scottish Labour's flagship policies of free bus travel for people over 60 and disabled people.

Re-elected for her constituency in the 2003 Scottish Parliament election, Boyack was elected by MSPs as Convener of the Scottish Parliament Environment and Rural Development Committee in June 2003. In this role, she received the RSPB Goldcrest Award in November 2004 for the most outstanding contribution to the development of environmental policy in Scotland since devolution. Later, in December 2005, she was named the Scottish Renewables Best Politician. She stood down from the committee in January 2007, when she returned to the Scottish Executive as Deputy Minister for the Environment and Rural Development.

Boyack lost her Edinburgh Central constituency seat in the 2011 Scottish Parliament election to Marco Biagi of the Scottish National Party (SNP). However, she was elected on the Lothian regional list as one of seven additional members. Following a landslide victory by the SNP in the election, Boyack co-chaired a review of the Labour Party in Scotland with Jim Murphy, commissioned by Ed Miliband in May 2011 and which reported back in Autumn of that year.

On 28 October 2014, Boyack declared she would stand in the upcoming election to become the Leader of the Scottish Labour Party. She came third to Jim Murphy and Neil Findlay with 9.24% of the vote.

She served as a member of the Parliament's Rural Affairs, Climate Change and Environment (RACCE) Committee during its scrutiny of the Land Reform Bill 2015.

Outside the Scottish Parliament: 2016–2019 

Boyack again contested the Edinburgh Central seat in the 2016 Scottish Parliament election, but was defeated by Scottish Conservative leader Ruth Davidson, who stood for the same constituency. Boyack was also placed third on the Lothian regional list of Labour candidates behind Kezia Dugdale and Neil Findlay, but did not return to Holyrood following the election since Labour won only two list seats.

In February 2017, Boyack was appointed as Head of Public Affairs at the Scottish Federation of Housing Associations, the membership body for social housing providers in Scotland.

Return following Kezia Dugdale's resignation: 2019–present 

On 30 April 2019, it was announced Boyack would return to the Scottish Parliament as a list MSP, following Kezia Dugdale's decision to vacate her seat in the summer. As an unsuccessful Labour candidate on the Lothian regional list in 2016, Boyack was the next person on the list if a seat was vacated. In September 2019, Scottish Labour leader Richard Leonard appointed her as Scottish Labour Spokesperson for Local Government.

Boyack nominated Anas Sarwar in the 2021 Scottish Labour leadership election.

Personal life 
Boyack married former long-term partner Andrew Walters in December 2000. They had planned to marry in the October but postponed the wedding due to the death of Donald Dewar. The couple divorced in 2003 and they had no children together.

Notes

References

External links
sarahboyack.com Constituency website
 
19 March 2011 Speech on environment and rural affairs at the Scottish Labour website
Sarah Boyack Biography at the Scottish Labour website
theyworkforyou.com
 Voting Record — Sarah Boyack MSP, Edinburgh Central
Scottish Federation of Housing Associations Staff page of Scottish Federation of Housing Associations

1961 births
Living people
Labour MSPs
Members of the Scottish Parliament for Edinburgh constituencies
Alumni of the University of Glasgow
Alumni of Heriot-Watt University
People educated at the Royal High School, Edinburgh
Members of the Scottish Parliament 1999–2003
Members of the Scottish Parliament 2003–2007
Members of the Scottish Parliament 2007–2011
Members of the Scottish Parliament 2011–2016
Members of the Scottish Parliament 2016–2021
Members of the Scottish Parliament 2021–2026
Ministers of the Scottish Government
Women members of the Scottish Government
20th-century Scottish women politicians
Scottish urban planners
Women urban planners